Luis Fernando Fuentes Vargas (born 14 September 1986) is a Mexican professional footballer who plays as a left-back for Liga MX club América.

Club career

Pumas
Fuentes played for Pumas Morelos and was called up by Pumas de la UNAM to be a substitute or to play in the CONCACAF Champions League and Interliga.

Fuentes debut was on 7 March 2009 in a match against San Luis in which he came in as a substitute replacing Fernando Morales on the 82nd minute.

Fuentes was part of the Pumas UNAM squads that won two championships, the Clausura 2009 and the Clausura 2011. For the Apertura 2016, Fuentes was selected team captain, at the suggestion of the team's prior captain, Darío Verón.

Loan to Monterrey 
On 2 December 2016, Fuentes joined Monterrey on a one-year loan agreement beginning with the Clausura 2017 tournament.

Xolos
Fuentes joined Xolos from Pumas for the Apertura 2018 season.

Loan to América
On 29 December 2019, Club América announced that Fuentes would be joining the team for the Clausura 2020 on loan from Xolos. After the Clausura 2020 tournament was cancelled due to the COVID-19 pandemic, América did not exercise the option to acquire Fuentes on a permanent deal and returned to Xolos.

América
On 26 August 2020, Fuentes re-joined Club América on a free transfer after his contract with Xolos ended and the border-town team did not renew it. América sought a defender prior to the transfer window close date as a result of the season-long injury sustained by Bruno Valdez against Monterrey.

International career
Fuentes made his debut for Mexico on 13 November 2015 against El Salvador which Mexico won 3–0.

Honours
UNAM
Mexican Primera División: Clausura 2009, Clausura 2011

Monterrey
Copa MX: Apertura 2017

References

External links
 
 

1986 births
Living people
People from Chetumal, Quintana Roo
Footballers from Quintana Roo
Association football fullbacks
Mexican footballers
Mexico international footballers
Club Universidad Nacional footballers
C.F. Monterrey players
Liga MX players